Pterostylis cycnocephala, commonly known as the swan greenhood, is a plant in the orchid family Orchidaceae and is endemic to south-eastern Australia. It has a rosette of leaves and up to 24 green flowers which have a labellum with a dark green, beak-like appendage. It is widespread and common from the Darling Downs in Queensland to Tasmania, usually growing with grasses.

Description
Pterostylis cycnocephala, is a terrestrial,  perennial, deciduous, herb with an underground tuber. Three to six stem leaves are wrapped around the flowering spike. The dorsal sepal and petals form a hood or "galea" over the column. The dorsal sepal is blunt and curved downwards with the sides turned down. Flowering occurs from August to December.

Taxonomy and naming
Pterostylis cycnocephala was first formally described in 1936 by Robert FitzGerald and the description was published in Fitzgerald's book, Australian Orchids. The specific epithet (cycnocephala) is derived from the Ancient Greek words kyknos meaning "swan" and kephale meaning "head", referring to the labellum appendage having the shape of a swan's head and neck.

Distribution and habitat
The swan greenhood is common and widespread from the Darling Downs in Queensland, through New South Wales and Victoria to Tasmania, growing mostly in grassy places.

References

cycnocephala
Endemic orchids of Australia
Orchids of New South Wales
Orchids of Queensland
Orchids of Tasmania
Orchids of Victoria (Australia)
Plants described in 1876